The Mapuera River is a tributary of the Trombetas River in Pará state in north-central Brazil.

The river basin lies partly within the  Grão-Pará Ecological Station, the largest fully protected tropical forest conservation unit on the planet.

See also
List of rivers of Pará

References
Brazilian Ministry of Transport

Rivers of Pará